The Preakness Stakes is an American thoroughbred horse race held on Armed Forces Day which is also the third Saturday in May each year at Pimlico Race Course in Baltimore, Maryland. It is a Grade I race run over a distance of 9.5 furlongs on dirt. Colts and geldings carry ; fillies . It is the second jewel of the Triple Crown, held two weeks after the Kentucky Derby and three weeks before the Belmont Stakes.

First run in 1873, the Preakness Stakes was named by a former Maryland governor after the colt who won the first Dinner Party Stakes at Pimlico. The race has been termed "The Run for the Black-Eyed Susans" because a blanket of Maryland's state flower is placed across the withers of the winning colt or filly. Attendance at the Preakness Stakes ranks second in North America among equestrian events, surpassed only by the Kentucky Derby.

The 148th running of the Preakness Stakes will be held on Saturday, May 20, 2023.

History
Two years before the Kentucky Derby was run for the first time, Pimlico introduced its new stakes race for three-year-olds, the Preakness, during its first-ever spring race meet in 1873. Then Maryland governor Oden Bowie named the then mile and one-half (2.41 km) race in honor of the colt Preakness from Milton Holbrook Sanford's Preakness Stud in Preakness, Wayne Township, New Jersey, who won the Dinner Party Stakes on the day Pimlico opened (October 25, 1870). The New Jersey name was said to have come from the Native American name Pra-qua-les ("Quail Woods") for the area. After Preakness won the Dinner Party Stakes, his jockey, Billy Hayward, untied a silk bag of gold coins that hung from a wire stretched across the track from the judges' stand. This was the supposed way that the "wire" at the finish line was introduced and how the awarding of "purse" money came to be. In reality, the term "purse", meaning prize money, had been in use for well over a century.

The first Preakness, held on May 27, 1873, drew seven starters. John Chamberlain's three-year-old, Survivor, collected the $2,050 winning purse by galloping home easily by 10 lengths. This was the largest margin of victory until 2004, when Smarty Jones won by 11 1/2 lengths.

In 1890, Morris Park Racecourse in the Bronx, New York hosted the Preakness Stakes. This race was run under handicap conditions, and the age restriction was lifted. The race was won by a five-year-old horse named Montague. After 1890, there was no race run for three years. For the 15 years from 1894 through 1908, the race was held at Gravesend Race Track on Coney Island, New York. In 1909 it returned to Pimlico.

Seven editions of the Preakness Stakes have been run under handicap conditions, in which more accomplished or favored horses are assigned to carry heavier weight. It was first run under these conditions in 1890 and again in the years 1910–1915. During these years, the race was known as the Preakness Handicap.

In March 2009 Magna Entertainment Corp., which owns Pimlico, filed for Chapter 11 bankruptcy thus throwing open the possibility the Stakes could move again. On April 13, 2009, the Maryland Legislature approved a plan to buy the Stakes and the Pimlico course if Magna Entertainment cannot find a buyer.

Attendance at the Preakness Stakes ranks second in North America and usually surpasses the attendance of all other stakes races including the Belmont Stakes, the Breeders' Cup and the Kentucky Oaks. The attendance of the Preakness Stakes typically only trails the Kentucky Derby, for more information see American thoroughbred racing top attended events.

In February 2017, the Maryland Stadium Authority released the first phase of a study saying that Pimlico needed $250 million in renovations. As of May of that year, no one showed interest in financing the work. The Stronach Group, owner of Pimlico Race Course and Laurel Park, was only interested in moving the Preakness Stakes to Laurel Park unless someone else financed work on Pimlico.

In October 2019, The Stronach Group reached an agreement in principle with the city of Baltimore and groups representing Maryland horsemen that would permanently keep the Preakness at Pimlico. As part of the agreement, Pimlico's grandstand would be demolished and replaced with a smaller structure, and temporary seating would be added to handle the attendance during Preakness week. 
The Racing and Community Development Act, approved by the Maryland state legislature in May 2020, allows the Maryland Stadium Authority to issue $375 million in bonds for the renovation of both Stronach Group tracks.

The 145th running of the Preakness Stakes was held on Saturday, October 3, 2020, a delay resulting from the COVID-19 outbreak earlier in the year, and setting the year's contest four weeks after the also-delayed Kentucky Derby. It was held without spectators for health reasons because of the outbreak.

Evolution of the Triple Crown series
The Preakness is the second leg in American thoroughbred racing's Triple Crown series and almost always attracts the Kentucky Derby winner, some of the other horses that ran in the Derby, and often a few horses that did not start in the Derby. The Preakness is  miles, or  furlongs (1.88 km), compared to the Kentucky Derby, which is  miles / 10 furlongs (2 km). It is followed by the third leg, the Belmont Stakes, which is  miles / 12 furlongs (2.4 km).

Since 1932, the order of Triple Crown races has the Kentucky Derby first, followed by the Preakness Stakes and then the Belmont Stakes. Prior to 1932, the Preakness was run before the Derby eleven times. On May 12, 1917, and again on May 13, 1922, the Preakness and the Derby were run on the same day.

To date, the Preakness is run on the third Saturday in May, two weeks after the Kentucky Derby, and three weeks before the Belmont Stakes. Consequently, the race is run no earlier than May 15, and no later than May 21. One exception is 2020, as that race was run in early October due to the COVID-19 pandemic.

Traditions

Traditionally, just after the horses for the Preakness were called to the post, the audience was invited to sing the third verse of "Maryland, My Maryland", the official state song of Maryland. For many years, the Baltimore Colts' Marching Band would lead the song from the infield; in later years, it was sung by the United States Naval Academy Glee Club. Use of the song was discontinued as of the 2020 edition of the race—the song "which celebrates the Confederacy, is considered by some to be racist.”

As soon as the Preakness winner has been declared official, a painter climbs a ladder to the top of a replica of the Old Clubhouse cupola. The colors of the victorious owner's silks are applied on the jockey and horse that are part of the weather vane atop the infield structure. The practice began in 1909 when a horse and rider weather vane sat atop the old Members' Clubhouse, which was constructed when Pimlico opened in 1870. The Victorian building was destroyed by fire in June 1966. A replica of the old building's cupola was built to stand in the Preakness winner's circle in the infield.

A blanket of yellow flowers daubed with black lacquer to recreate the appearance of a black-eyed Susan is placed around the winning horse's neck at this time, and a replica of the Woodlawn Vase is given to the winning horse's owner. Should that horse have also won the Kentucky Derby, speculation and excitement immediately begin to mount as to whether that horse will go on to win the Triple Crown of Thoroughbred Racing at the Belmont Stakes in June.

Winning the race
In 1917, the first Woodlawn Vase was awarded to the Preakness winner, who was not allowed to keep it. Eventually, a half-size reproduction of the trophy was given to winners to keep permanently. The original trophy is kept at the Baltimore Museum of Art and brought to the race each year under guard, for the winner's presentation ceremony.

In 1940, it was proposed to drape the winning horse in a garland of the Maryland State flower, Rudbeckia hirta, commonly called black-eyed Susans. This posed a problem, as the race is run nearly two months before the flowers come into bloom in late June or July. At first, yellow Viking daisies were painted to resemble black-eyed Susans. Painted flowers have been discontinued since the first decade of the current millennium and viking poms, a member of the chrysanthemum family, are now used. Although the Preakness is sometimes referred to as "the race for the black-eyed Susans", no black-eyed Susan is ever used.

In 1918, 26 horses entered the race, and it was run in two divisions, providing for two winners that year. Currently, the race is limited to 14 horses.

In 1948, the Preakness was televised for the first time by CBS.

The Preakness has been run at seven different distances:
 miles (2.41 km) : 1873–1888, 1890
 miles (2.01 km) : 1889
 miles (1.71 km) : 1894–1900, 1908
1 mile 70 yards (1.67 km) : 1901–1907
1 mile (1.61 km) : 1909, 1910
 miles (1.81 km) : 1911–1924
 miles (1.91 km) : 1925–present

Purse money
At its inauguration in 1873, the Preakness carried a value of $1,000. The first major increase occurred in 1919 when the race had a $25,000 value. It climbed to $100,000 in 1946 and in 1959 was raised to $150,000. Subsequent increases occurred from 1979 to 1989, when the purse rose four times from $200,000 to $500,000, before going to $1 million in 1997. On December 12, 2013, the Maryland Jockey Club announced for the 2014 running of the Preakness, the purse would be increased from $1,000,000 to $1,500,000.

InfieldFest
The race has had something of a party atmosphere in the past, especially in the infield, which is general admission. The course had a "bring your own booze" policy until 2009, formerly including kegs of beer but in the 2000s restricted to all the beer cans a person could carry in a cooler. However, despite crowds in excess of 100,000, the BYOB policy was canceled in 2009 after videos of intoxicated people running along the tops of lines of portable toilets while being pelted by beer cans reached a large audience.

In 2009, with the alcohol ban, race attendance dropped to 77,850 after topping 100,000 for eight consecutive years. In 2010, and the Maryland Jockey Club responded with a new event called "InfieldFest" with performances by musical acts, the "Mug Club", which included an infield ticket and an unlimited-refill beer mug, and a mascot named "Kegasus", a play on keg and pegasus (though actually a centaur). The much-derided Kegasus was retired in 2013. In 2010, ticket sales had recovered to 95,760 and have since stayed high.

Aside from InfieldFest, the race is known for its fancy hats and official cocktail, the Black-eyed Susan, made with vodka, St-Germain liqueur and pineapple, lime and orange juices.

Records
Speed record: 
  miles (1.91 km) – 1:53 – Secretariat (1973)

Secretariat, the 1973 winner (and ultimately Triple Crown winner) was originally credited with a running time of 1:55. Two Daily Racing Form clockers, however, had timed Secretariat's Preakness in 1:53 , which would be a new stakes record.  A hearing was held over the time discrepancy, where a video replay showed Secretariat reached the wire faster than Canonero II, the then-current record holder, but instead of giving Secretariat the record, the Maryland Jockey Club decided to split the difference and make its official time that of Pimlico's clocker, who had timed the race in 1:54 . The matter was finally resolved in June 2012, when a meeting of the Maryland Racing Commission unanimously ruled to change Secretariat's final time to 1:53 based on testimony and analysis of the race replays. Consequently, Secretariat holds the current official record for all three Triple Crown races.

Margin of Victory:
 11½ lengths – Smarty Jones (2004)

Most wins by a jockey:
 6 – Eddie Arcaro (1941, 1948, 1950, 1951, 1955, 1957)

Most wins by a trainer:
 7 – Bob Baffert (1997, 1998, 2001, 2002, 2010, 2015, 2018)
 7 – R. Wyndham Walden (1875, 1878, 1879, 1880, 1881, 1882, 1888)

Most wins by an owner:
 7 – Calumet Farm (1941, 1944, 1947, 1948, 1956, 1958, 1968, 2013) (also the leading breeder with 7)

Fillies in the Preakness
Six fillies have won the Preakness:
 2020 – Swiss Skydiver 
 2009 – Rachel Alexandra
 1924 – Nellie Morse
 1915 – Rhine Maiden
 1906 – Whimsical
 1903 – Flocarline

Winners of The Preakness Stakes since 1873 
Triple Crown winners are in bold.

Notes:
Timed to  second 1873 to 1899, to  second 1900 to 2002, to 0.01 second since 2003.
All winners have been three years old, except Montague in 1890 who was five years old.

A † designates a filly.
§ D. Wayne Lukas swept the 1995 Triple Crown with two different horses.

Sire lines

 the Darley Arabian (1700c) sire line (all branched through the Eclipse (1764) line) produced 128 Stakes winners (119 colts, 3 geldings, 6 fillies), including all winners from 1938 to present. The main branches of this sire line are:
 the King Fergus (1775) branch (all branched through the Voltigeur (1847) line), produced 13 winners. His sire line continued primarily through his son Vedette (1854) with 12 winners, due primarily to his son Galopin (1872) with 9 winners (exclusively through St. Simon (1881), most recently Pleasant Colony in 1981).
 the Potoooooooo (1773) branch produced 114 winners (all branched through the Waxy (1790) line), including all winners from 1982 to present. The primary branch of this sire line is through Whalebone (1807), which has produced 113 winners. In turn, the primary branch continues through Sir Hercules (1826), which has produced 95 winners (including all winners since 1984), and then the Birdcatcher (1833) branch which produced 89 winners. From Birdcatcher, the branch of The Baron (1842) has produced 83 winners (exclusively through the Stockwell (1849) line). Birdcatcher's grandson Doncaster (1870) sired Bend Or (1877), whose sire line accounts for 75 winners. The main branch of the Bend Or sire line continued through his son Bona Vista (1889) with 61 winners, nearly exclusively through the Phalaris (1913) line with 60 winners, which has dominated in the last several decades (including all winners from 1984 to present) through the following sons:  
the Fairway (1925) branch (1 winner, most recently Bally Ache in 1960);
the Pharamond (1925) branch (5 winners, most recently Silver Charm in 1997); 
the Sickle (1924) branch, which has produced all winners from 2021 to present (25 winners exclusively through Polynesian (1942) with his win in the 1945 Preakness Stakes, continued exclusively through his son Native Dancer (1950) with his win in the 1953 Preakness Stakes, continued primarily through his son Raise a Native (1961) with 21 winners, down through Mr Prospector (1970) with 18 winners through 9 different sons: Tank’s Prospect, with his win in the 1985 Preakness Stakes, and 8 other sons through their progeny, with his son Fappiano (1977) accounting for 5 winners (most recently Early Voting in 2022)); 
the Pharos (1920) branch (29 winners all branched through the Nearco (1935) line, through his sons Royal Charger (1942), Nearctic (1954), and Nasrullah (1940)). The Royal Charger branch produced 5 winners (most recently Swiss Skydiver in 2020), the Nasrullah branch produced 11 winners primarily due to his son Bold Ruler (1954) with 10 winners (most recently California Chrome in 2014), while the Nearctic branch produced 13 winners, exclusively through his son Northern Dancer (1961) with his win in the 1964 Preakness Stakes, and direct male progeny of 12 winners, most recently War of Will in 2019, with his son Storm Bird (1978) accounting for 5 winners (most recently Justify in 2018).
 Special notes:
 An offshoot of the Whalebone (1807) branch, the Camel (1822) branch (14 winners exclusively through the Touchstone (1831) line), produced 1983 Preakness Stakes winner Deputed Testimony through his grandson Newminster's (1848) branch. Since then, each winner of the Preakness Stakes has gone through Whalebone's more frequent sire line branch of Sir Herecules (1826). The Newminster branch is the more common of the two branches derived through Camel with 8 winners. Newminster's brother Orlando (1841) produced 6 winners (exclusively through the Commando (1898) line with 6 winners), most recently Carry Back in 1961.
 The Sir Hercules (1826) branch produced two main lines: the primary branch of Birdcatcher (1833), and the secondary branch of Faugh-a-Ballagh (1841) which produced 6 winners (exclusively through the Leamington (1853) line), most recently 1901 Preakness Stakes winner The Parader.
 The Birdcatcher (1833) branch produced two main lines: the primary branch of The Baron (1842), and the secondary branch of Oxford (1857) which produced 6 winners (exclusively through the Sterling (1868) line), most recently 1946 Preakness Stakes winner Assault.
 The Bend Or (1877) branch produced two main lines: the primary branch of Bona Vista (1889), and the secondary branch of Ormonde (1883) which produced 10 winners (primarily through the Teddy (1913) line with 8 winners), most recently 1967 Preakness Stakes winner Damascus.
 the Byerley Turk (1680c) sire line produced 13 winners (10 colts, 3 geldings). The main branches of this sire (all branched through the Herod (1758) line) are:
 the Highflyer (1774) branch produced 1 winner, most recently Montague in 1890
 the Florizel (1768) branch produced 6 winners (all branched through the Lexington (1850) line), most recently Hindus in 1900
 the Woodpecker (1773) branch produced 6 winners (all branched through the Buzzard (1787) line). The main branches of this sire line are:
the Castrel (1801) branch produced 1 winner, most recently Kalitan in 1917
the Selim (1802) branch produced 5 winners (all branched through the Vandal (1850) line). The main branches of this sire line are:
 Survivor (1870), winner of the 1873 Preakness Stakes
the Virgil (1864) branch produced 4 winners (1882 Preakness Stakes winner Vanguard, and 3 winners branched through the Hindoo (1878) line), most recently Buskin in 1913
 the Godolphin Arabian (1724c) sire line produced 7 winners (6 colts, 1 gelding). The main branches of this sire (all branched through the Australian (1858) line) are:
the Attila (1871) branch produced 1 winner, most recently Tecumseh in 1885
the Spendthrift (1876) branch produced 6 winners (1894 Preakness Stakes winner Assignee (1891) and 5 winners branched through the Hastings (1893) line), including:
 Don Enrique (1904), winner of the 1907 Preakness Stakes
 the Fair Play (1905) branch produced 4 winners, most recently War Admiral in 1937
Preakness Stakes winners with male-line descendants including other Preakness Stakes winners
 Polynesian (1945 winner) – 24 winners (23 colts, 1 gelding); most recently Early Voting (2022)
 Native Dancer (1953 winner) – 23 winners (22 colts, 1 gelding); most recently Early Voting (2022)
 Northern Dancer (1964 winner) – 12 winners (11 colts, 1 filly); most recently War of Will (2019)
 Bold Ruler (1957 winner) – 7 colts; most recently California Chrome (2014)
 Seattle Slew (1977 winner) – 2 colts; most recently California Chrome (2014)
 Gallant Fox (1930 winner) – 1 colt; Omaha (1935)
 Man o' War (1920 winner) – 1 colt; War Admiral (1937)
 Bold Venture (1936 winner) – 1 colt; Assault (1946)
 Citation (1948 winner) – 1 colt; Fabius (1956)
 Secretariat (1973 winner) – 1 colt; Risen Star (1988)
 Summer Squall (1990 winner) – 1 colt; Charismatic (1999)
 Curlin (2007 winner) – 1 colt; Exaggerator (2016)

See also

 American thoroughbred racing top attended events
 Black-Eyed Susan Stakes
 List of Preakness Stakes broadcasters
 Maryland Jockey Club
 Preakness Stakes top four finishers
 Triple Crown Productions
 Triple Crown of Thoroughbred Racing
 Grand Slam of Thoroughbred Racing

References

External links

Among the people of Baltimore's Preakness Stakes
The Preakness Stakes and Revisionist History
Ten Things You Should Know About the Preakness at Hello Race Fans!
The History of The Preakness Stakes

 
1873 establishments in Maryland
Annual sporting events in the United States
Flat horse races for three-year-olds
Grade 1 stakes races in the United States
Graded stakes races in the United States
Horse races in Maryland
Pimlico Race Course
Recurring sporting events established in 1873
Sports competitions in Baltimore
Triple Crown of Thoroughbred Racing